Black Widow is the eponymous second album by English rock band Black Widow. It was issued in 1971 on CBS Records and was produced by Patrick Meehan Jr. On Black Widow, the occult-based lyrical themes that had dominated the band's debut disappeared.

Track listing
"Tears & Wine" – 8:58 (Geoff Griffith, Jim Gannon, Kip Trevor, Romeo Challenger, Zoot Taylor)
"The Gypsy" – 4:33 (Gannon)
"Bridge Passage" – 0:30 (Griffith)
"When My Mind Was Young" – 5:12 (Griffith, Gannon)
"The Journey" – 5:52 (Gannon, Trevor, Taylor)
"Poser" – 7:46 (Griffith, Gannon, Trevor, Challenger, Taylor)
"Mary Clark" – 4:07 (Gannon, Bill Litchfield)
"Wait Until Tomorrow" – 3:24 (Gannon)
"An Afterthought" – 1:12 (Griffith, Gannon, Trevor, Challenger, Taylor)
"Legend of Creation" – 5:58 (Gannon)

Personnel
Kip Trevor – lead and backing vocals, maracas, tambourine
Clive Jones – saxophone, flute
Jim Gannon – lead, rhythm, acoustic and twelve-string guitars, backing vocals
Zoot Taylor – organ, piano
Geoff Griffith – bass, backing vocals
Romeo Challenger – drums, percussion

References

External links
Black Widow at Discogs

1971 albums
Black Widow (band) albums
CBS Records albums
Albums produced by Patrick Meehan (producer)